Roecliffe is a village and civil parish in the Harrogate district of North Yorkshire, England. It is situated near the A1 road motorway which connects London with Edinburgh and is 1 mile west of Boroughbridge. It is on the banks of the River Ure and the village centres on the village green which doubles up as the school playing field.

The village has a pub, The Crown Inn, which offers 5 star accommodation with a 16th-century theme. The village itself is surrounded by scenic views with St Mary's Church, Roecliffe as its main attraction in the heart of the village. The church is believed to be the only church in the country with an entirely vaulted roof. Close to Roecliffe are the Yorkshire Dales and the Yorkshire Dales National Park, which are known for spectacular scenery and a range of wildlife habitats. Also close by is the village Skelton-on-Ure.

History
Excavations in 1993 uncovered two 1st-century Roman forts at Roecliffe, located where the modern A1(M) crosses the River Ure.  It is believed that the forts were short-lived and were abandoned in favour of Aldborough, 1 mile east.

Roecliffe was historically a township in the parish of Aldborough in the West Riding of Yorkshire. It became a separate civil parish in 1866. In 1974 Roecliffe was transferred from the West Riding to the new county of North Yorkshire.

Until 1 October 1998, Roecliffe was part of the Claro Registration District. It now comes under the North Yorkshire registration district Harrogate.

In the 1870s, Roecliffe was described as: 
"ROCLIFF, or Roecliff, a township-chapelry in Aldborough parish, W. R. Yorkshire; on the river Ure, 1½mile W S W of Boroughbridge r. station. Post-town, Boroughbridge, under York. Acres, 1, 794. Real property, £2, 497. Pop., 231. Houses, 53."

Population

The population in the area has always been small and as of the 2011 census was 238. This as shown has fluctuated over time with its most significant decrease in the 1950s where it merely reached 150. Although fluctuations occurred over the years, the population in 2011 is very similar to what it was in 1871.

In the past agriculture and general workers were the most common occupation for males. Most females with declared occupations worked in domestic service.

Transport
Roecliffe has one bus service which runs from Ripon to Harrogate. The nearest railway station is at Knaresborough.

Education
Roecliffe has one school, Roecliffe Church of England School, a primary school, which has outstanding Ofsted reports. The village green provides a recreation area. Secondary school education can be found nearby in Harrogate. Harrogate High School is a mixed school for children aged 11 to 18 and has approximately 720 students.

Roecliffe's Pond and Meadows
The area close to the River Ure was once a clay pit in the 19th century, and has been transformed into a private nature reserve.  
The Roecliffe Ramble is a walk from the village starting at the church and along the River Ure passing locks and Newby Hall (an eighteenth-century country house situated on the banks of the river).

Weather and terrain
Roecliffe is flat surrounded by hilly countryside and close by the upland area of the Yorkshire Dales, as a result the weather is unpredictable. The coldest month is January where temperatures reach five degrees with the likelihood of snow and barely reaches twenty degrees in the warmest months July and August. The Pennines *-protect the villages below from the prevailing wind and therefore they only see around 150 days of rain on average per annum. This means that in general there is more sunshine than rainfall in the area.

See also
St Mary's Church, Roecliffe
Newby Hall

References

External links

Villages in North Yorkshire
Civil parishes in North Yorkshire